Rio Azuma (born 27 July 1998) is a Japanese fencer. She represented Japan in the women's team foil event at the 2020 Summer Olympics.

Azuma finished fifth in team foil at the 2018 Junior World Fencing Championships. She is the sister of fencer Sera Azuma. Their mother Miki fenced internationally at junior level, and encouraged both daughters to take up the sport.

References

1998 births
Living people
People from Wakayama (city)
Sportspeople from Wakayama Prefecture
Japanese female foil fencers
Fencers at the 2020 Summer Olympics
Olympic fencers of Japan
Competitors at the 2017 Summer Universiade
21st-century Japanese women
20th-century Japanese women